The following is the list of UFO sightings reported in Indonesia.

 Medan, Sumatra, January 28, 1953 
 Malang, Java, February 21, 1953 
 Gorontalo, Sulawesi, February 23, 1953 
 Medan, Sumatra, June 26, 1955
 Alor Island, East Nusa Tenggara, July 1959
 Jakarta, 1962
 Surabaya, East Java, 1964
 Yogyakarta, Yogyakarta Special Region, 1964
 Mount Agung, Bali, 1973
 Jakarta, October 7, 1977
 Jakarta, November 11, 1977
 Yogyakarta, Yogyakarta Special Region 1980
 Tarakan Island, East Kalimantan, 1984
 Jakarta, 1986
 Bandung, West Java, 1989
 Bali, 1991
 Probolinggo, East Java, 1994
 Salatiga, Central Java, July 1995
 Pengandonan, February 1996
 Salatiga, Central Java, September 1997
 Mount Salak, West Java, April 16, 1998
 Denpasar, Bali, February 3, 2000
 Salatiga, Central Java, October 12, 2003
 Seminyak, Bali, March 18, 2011

See also 
 List of UFO sightings
 UFO sightings in Australia

References

Indonesia
Historical events in Indonesia